Clément Rosset (12 October 1939 – 28 March 2018) was a French philosopher and writer. He was a professor of philosophy at the University of Nice Sophia Antipolis, and the author of books on 20th-century philosophy and postmodern philosophy.

Early life
Rosset was born on 12 October 1939 in Barneville-Carteret, France. He graduated from the École Normale Supérieure, and he passed the agrégation of philosophy in 1965.

Career
Rosset taught French at the Université de Montréal in Quebec, Canada for two years. He was a professor of philosophy at the University of Nice Sophia Antipolis in Nice, France until his retirement in the late 1990s.

The bulk of his work consists in some 30 short books, all of them brief studies or essays on various topics. Most popular is probably Le réel et son double, that deals in an original manner with the inevitably illusionistic character of representations. Arthur Schopenhauer, on whom Rosset has published a few studies, remains a constant reference throughout his works. The fight with depression introduced a more personal strain in the later writings of Clément Rosset.

Death
Rosset died on 28 March 2018 in Paris, France.

Publications 
In English:
Joyful Cruelty: Toward a Philosophy of the Real (Free Association, 2010)
The Real and its Double (The University of Chicago Press, 2012)

In French:
 La Philosophie tragique, Paris, Presses Universitaires de France, 1960 
 Le Monde et ses remèdes, Paris, Presses universitaires de France, Paris, 1964  
 Lettre sur les chimpanzés : plaidoyer pour une humanité totale, Paris, Éditions Gallimard, 1965, reprint 1999 
 Schopenhauer, philosophe de l'absurde, Paris, Presses universitaires de France, 1967, 2010 
 L'Esthétique de Schopenhauer, Paris, Presses universitaires de France, 1969 
 (under the pseudonym Roboald Marcas) Précis de philosophie moderne, Paris, R. Laffont, 1968, reprint. Écrits satiriques 1, Paris, Presses universitaires de France, 2008  
 (under the pseudonym Roger Crémant) Les matinées structuralistes, suivies d'un Discours sur l'écrithure (sic), Paris, R. Laffont, 1969, partial reprint : Les Matinées savantes, Montpellier, 2011 
 Logique du pire : éléments pour une philosophie tragique, Paris, Presses Universitaires de France, series , 1971 
 L'Anti-nature : éléments pour une philosophie tragique, Paris, Presses Universitaires de France, 1973 
  : essai sur l'illusion, Paris, Gallimard, 1976 
 Le Réel : Traité de l'idiotie, Paris, Éditions de Minuit, 1977 
 L'Objet singulier, Paris, Éditions de Minuit, 1979, 
 La Force majeure, Paris, Éditions de Minuit, 1983 
 Le Philosophe et les sortilèges, Paris, Éditions de Minuit, 1985 
 Le Principe de cruauté, Paris, Éditions de Minuit, 1988 
 Mozart, une folie de l'allégresse, Paris, Mercure de France, 1990, reprint Le cas Mozart, Le Passeur, 2013 (written by Rosset and Didier Raymond)
 Principes de sagesse et de folie, Paris, Éditions de Minuit, 1991 
 En ce temps-là - Notes sur Louis Althusser, Paris, Éditions de Minuit, 1992 
 Matière d'art : hommages, Nantes, Le Passeur, 1992, rééd. Montpellier, Fata Morgana, 2010 
 Le Choix des mots, Paris, Éditions de Minuit, 1995 
 Le Démon de la tautologie, Paris, Éditions de Minuit, 1997  
 Route de nuit : épisodes cliniques, Paris, Gallimard, 1999  
 Le Réel, l'imaginaire et l'illusoire, Biarritz, Distance, 2000  (reissued in Fantasmagories, Paris, Éditions de Minuit, 2005)
 Loin de moi : étude sur l'identité, Paris, Éditions de Minuit, 2001 
 Le Régime des passions, Paris, Éditions de Minuit, 2001  
 Propos sur le cinéma, Paris, Presses universitaires de France, 2001 
 Franchise postale [correspondence with ], Presses universitaires de France, 2003 
 Impressions fugitives : L'ombre, le reflet, l'écho, Paris, Éditions de Minuit, 2004 
 Fantasmagories, Paris, Éditions de Minuit, 2005 
 L'École du réel, Paris, Éditions de Minuit, 2008  [anthology]
 La Nuit de mai, Paris, Éditions de Minuit, 2008 . 
 Une passion homicide, Paris, Presses universitaires de France, 2008 
 Le Monde perdu, Éditions Fata Morgana, 2009  
 Tropiques. Cinq conférences mexicaines, Paris, Éditions de Minuit, 2010 
 La folie sans peine, written by Didier Raymond [édition originale : Points, 1991] et remanié par l'auteur, dessins de Jean-Charles Fitoussi, PUF, 2010 
 Récit d'un noyé, Paris, Éditions de Minuit, 2012 
 L'Invisible, Paris, Éditions de Minuit, 2012 
 Question sans réponse [postface to Santiago Espinosa, L'inexpressif musical, Encre Marine, 2013]
 Faits divers, Paris, PUF, Perspectives critiques, 2013 
 Esquisse biographique. Entretiens avec Santiago Espinosa, Encre Marine, 2017
 L'endroit du paradis. Trois études. Paris, Les Belles Lettres, 2018

Bibliography 
 Marc Alpozzo, Le langage du réel ou de la tautologie selon Clément Rosset, Les Carnets de la Philosophie, n°12, July–August-September 2010, read online
 Roxanne Breton, L'unique et le double : la répétition et la joie dans l'œuvre de Clément Rosset, Dialogue: Canadian Philosophical Review, vol.55/2, 2016
 Sébastien Charles, La philosophie française en questions. Interviews with Comte-Sponville, Conche, Ferry, Lipovetsky, Onfray et Rosset, Paris, Le Livre de Poche, 2004, read online
 Jacques Dewitte, Le réel simple ou double. Sur l' "ontologie du réel" de Clément Rosset, Critique n°730, 2008, 
 Rafael Del Hierro, La filosofia tragica. Aprobacion de lo real y critica del doble. Thèse de doctorat, Madrid, 1995 (édition numérique)
 Rafael Del Hierro, Rosset y los filosofos. Estudios sobre Schopenhauer y Nietzsche, 2014 (édition numérique)
 Rafael Del Hierro, Rosset (1939), Madrid, 2001
 Denis Lejeune, The philosophy of Clément Rosset (in The Radical Use of Chance in 20th Century Art, Amsterdam, Rodopi, 2012)
 Olga del Pilar Lopez-Betancur, La philosophie tragique chez Clément Rosset : un regard sur le réel. Thèse de doctorat, Paris, 2014, read online
 Pierre-Yves Macé, Photo-, phono- et cinématographie chez Clément Rosset, Labyrinthe n°36-1, 2011, read online
 Philippe Mengue, Clément Rosset : de la pensée du simple à l'allégresse, Critique, n°409-410, 1981,  
 Jean Tellez, La joie et le tragique. Introduction à la pensée de Clément Rosset, Éditions Germina, 2009
 Stéphane Vinolo, Clément Rosset, la philosophie comme anti-ontologie, L'Harmattan, 2012
 
 Jean-Charles Fitoussi : De la musique ou la jota de Rosset (2013) (documentary)

References

External links 
Atelier Clément Rosset: a French, comprehensive blog on the philosopher
Official website with full references
 Atelier Clément Rosset (numerous articles and bibliography)
 Clément Rosset  (France Culture)
 Entretien avec Pierre Dumayet (1961) on YouTube

1939 births
2018 deaths
People from Manche
École Normale Supérieure alumni
Academic staff of Côte d'Azur University
20th-century French philosophers
21st-century French philosophers
Roger Nimier Prize winners